Benjamin Davidovich (born February 18, 1930) was an Israeli goalkeeper who played for Maccabi Haifa. A Holocaust survivor, Davidovich arrived to Mandatory Israel and settled in Rishon leZion in 1945. His son, Nir, is often seen as a spitting image of his father and later progressed to become one of Maccabi Haifa's most iconic figures.

External links
  Profile and biography of Benjamin Davidovich on Maccabi Haifa's official website

1930 births
Living people
Israeli Jews
Israeli footballers
Association football goalkeepers
Maccabi Haifa F.C. players